Royds is a ward in the metropolitan borough of the City of Bradford, West Yorkshire, England.  It contains 29 listed buildings that are recorded in the National Heritage List for England.  Of these, two are listed at Grade II*, the middle of the three grades, and the others are at Grade II, the lowest grade. The ward is to the south of the centre of Bradford, and includes the area of Buttershaw, and parts of Horton Bank and Low Moor.  The oldest and most important building in the ward is Royds Hall, which is listed, together with a number of associated structures.  The other listed buildings consist of houses, cottages and associated structures, farmhouses and farm buildings, public houses, buildings remaining from a former textile mill, and a school.


Key

Buildings

References

Citations

Sources

 

Lists of listed buildings in West Yorkshire
Listed